Svend Glendau (12 March 1910 – 27 February 1945) was a member of the Danish resistance executed by the German occupying power.

Biography 

Svend Glendau was born in Tim Præstegaard 12 March 1910 as the fourth of eight children to parish priest Peder Severinsen and wife Ellen Victoria Carla Nielsen and baptized Svend Severinsen in Tim church on Store Bededag the same year.

In 1913 the family moved from Tim to Bringstrup, where the father continued as a parish priest. He was confirmed by his father in Bringstrup, on Palm Sunday in 1924.

By 1930 he was no longer living with his parents and one of his six siblings had died.

On 19 March 1937 he changed his name to Svend Glendau and on 5 June 1939 he formally left the Church of Denmark, four months after his father had died.

In 1939 he registered a phone as a journalist residing Nyhavn 39, Copenhagen. The two following years he kept the phone while residing as a travel guide first at Amagertorv 10A and then Peder Skramsgade 26, Copenhagen.

In 1943 and 1944 Glendau again registered a phone, this time as a policeman and stud.jur. residing in Kronprinsessegade 49.

Glendau's membership of the resistance was betrayed to Gestapo by Jørgen Børge Axel Lorenzen, leader of the infamous Lorenzen Group and on 13 January 1945 Glendau was arrested. Lorenzen was executed in 1949 in part because of this.

On 27 February 1945 Glendau and nine other resistance members were executed in Ryvangen.

After his death 

After the liberation an inquest in the Department of Forensic Medicine of the university of Copenhagen determined that the cause of death was ballistic trauma.

On 29 August 1945 Glendau and 105 other victims of the occupation were given a state funeral in the memorial park founded at the execution and burial site in Ryvangen where he was executed. Bishop Hans Fuglsang-Damgaard led the service with participation from the royal family, the government and representatives of the resistance movement.

On 19 September 1947 a memorial wall in the Copenhagen Police Headquarters with the names of 157 policemen who lost their lives during the occupation including that of Glendau was inaugurated.

Similarly a memorial plaque for Glendau was mounted at the police station in Antonigade 11.

References 

1910 births
1945 deaths
People executed by Nazi Germany by firing squad
Danish resistance members
Danish people executed by Nazi Germany
Resistance members killed by Nazi Germany